Aloofushi or Aluvifushi is one of the uninhabited islands of Dhaalu Atoll in the Maldives.

Uninhabited islands of the Maldives